Der Stellvertreter may refer to:
 The Deputy or Der Stellvertreter, a 1963 play by Rolf Hochhuth
 Amen., a 2002 film based on that play, by its original German title